McDonald's Video Game is a Flash game published and developed by the Italy-based group Molleindustria in 2006. It is described as an "anti-advergame", meaning a satire of various companies and its business practices. It has also been classified as a newsgame or an editorial game by Ian Bogost.

McDonald's Video Game is a satirical parody of the business practices of the corporate quick-service restaurant giant McDonald's, taking the guise of a tycoon-style business-simulation game. The game presents the player with four views: the farmland, the slaughterhouse, the restaurant and the corporate HQ. Through each of these views, decisions can be made which will affect the fate of the player's company. In the game, the player takes on the role of a McDonald's CEO by choosing whether or not to feed the player's cows genetically altered grain, plow over rainforests or feed the player's cattle to other cattle (a practice known to spread mad cow disease). The player can also choose to advertise strategies and public official corruption to counteract opponents of the player's actions.

Some choices within the game, such as the opportunity to demolish villages or bribe public officials, paint the corporation in a negative light. These aspects of the game are unflattering to McDonald's, who issued a statement saying that the game "has no association with McDonald's and is therefore a complete misrepresentation of our people and our values."

On some websites (such as Kongregate), Molleindustria released a version of the game called Burger Tycoon which is exactly the same except that it eliminates all mention of McDonald's such as the franchise logo and a bear replacing the Ronald McDonald mascot. This was done in order to avoid copyright sanctions.

All online instances of the game currently suffer a bug wherein the "Slaught-o-matic" does not produce patties when slaughtering cows, rendering the game unplayable. The only way to play is to download the game directly from Molleindustria's website itself. 

The game has been translated into nine languages: English, Spanish, Italian, Finnish, Danish, Turkish, Portuguese, French and German.

Gameplay
TBA

Development
TBA

Reception
TBA

References

External links
 
 Burger Tycoon

2006 video games
Art games
Video games developed in Italy
Business simulation games
Criticisms of companies
Flash games
Freeware games
Humanitarian video games
McDonald's
Parody video games
Single-player video games
Top-down video games
Indie video games
Browser games
McDonald's video games